Myrmecium is a genus of ant-mimicking corinnid sac spiders first described by Pierre André Latreille in 1824. The unrelated jumping spider species Synemosyna formica has been mistaken for a member of this genus twice, once by Eugène Simon in 1897 (Myrmecium lunatum) and once by Cândido Firmino de Mello-Leitão in 1932 (Myrmecium rubrum).

Species
 it contains thirty-nine species in South America and the Caribbean:
Myrmecium amphora Candiani & Bonaldo, 2017 – Venezuela
Myrmecium bifasciatum Taczanowski, 1874 – Bolivia, Trinidad, Guyana, Suriname, French Guiana, Brazil
Myrmecium bolivari Candiani & Bonaldo, 2017 – Venezuela, Colombia
Myrmecium bonaerense Holmberg, 1881 – Argentina
Myrmecium camponotoides Mello-Leitão, 1932 – Brazil
Myrmecium carajas Candiani & Bonaldo, 2017 – Brazil
Myrmecium carvalhoi Candiani & Bonaldo, 2017 – Brazil
Myrmecium catuxy Candiani & Bonaldo, 2017 – Colombia, Brazil
Myrmecium chikish Candiani & Bonaldo, 2017 – Peru
Myrmecium cizauskasi Candiani & Bonaldo, 2017 – Brazil
Myrmecium dacetoniforme Mello-Leitão, 1932 – Brazil
Myrmecium deladanta Candiani & Bonaldo, 2017 – Ecuador
Myrmecium diasi Candiani & Bonaldo, 2017 – Brazil
Myrmecium erici Candiani & Bonaldo, 2017 – Guyana
Myrmecium ferro Candiani & Bonaldo, 2017 – Brazil
Myrmecium fuscum Dahl, 1907 – Peru, Bolivia, Brazil
Myrmecium indicattii Candiani & Bonaldo, 2017 – Brazil
Myrmecium latreillei (Lucas, 1857) – Brazil
Myrmecium lomanhungae Candiani & Bonaldo, 2017 – Brazil
Myrmecium luepa Candiani & Bonaldo, 2017 – Venezuela
Myrmecium machetero Candiani & Bonaldo, 2017 – Bolivia, Peru
Myrmecium malleum Candiani & Bonaldo, 2017 – Venezuela, Colombia
Myrmecium monacanthum Simon, 1897 – Colombia
Myrmecium nogueirai Candiani & Bonaldo, 2017 – Peru, Brazil
Myrmecium oliveirai Candiani & Bonaldo, 2017 – Brazil
Myrmecium oompaloompa Candiani & Bonaldo, 2017 – Brazil, Guyana
Myrmecium otti Candiani & Bonaldo, 2017 – Peru, Brazil
Myrmecium pakpaka Candiani & Bonaldo, 2017 – Peru
Myrmecium raveni Candiani & Bonaldo, 2017 – Brazil
Myrmecium reticulatum Dahl, 1907 – Peru
Myrmecium ricettii Candiani & Bonaldo, 2017 – Colombia, Brazil
Myrmecium rufum Latreille, 1824 (type) – Brazil
Myrmecium souzai Candiani & Bonaldo, 2017 – Brazil
Myrmecium tanguro Candiani & Bonaldo, 2017 – Brazil
Myrmecium tikuna Candiani & Bonaldo, 2017 – Brazil
Myrmecium trifasciatum Caporiacco, 1947 – Guyana, Brazil
Myrmecium urucu Candiani & Bonaldo, 2017 – Brazil
Myrmecium viehmeyeri Dahl, 1907 – Peru, Bolivia, Brazil
Myrmecium yamamotoi Candiani & Bonaldo, 2017 – Suriname, Brazil

References

External links
 Clubionid ant-mimic from Trinidad and Tobago (Myrmecium sp. according to American Arachnology Online)

Corinnidae
Spiders of South America
Araneomorphae genera
Taxa named by Pierre André Latreille